The 2015 LSU Tigers baseball team represent Louisiana State University during the 2015 NCAA Division I baseball season. The Tigers play their home games at Alex Box Stadium as a member of the Southeastern Conference. They are led by head coach Paul Mainieri, in his 9th season at LSU.

At the end of the regular season, junior shortstop Alex Bregman was selected by the Houston Astros as the second pick of the 2015 MLB Draft. Bregman was the fifth LSU Tiger to be drafted in the first round in seven years, the highest-drafted position player in LSU's history, and the second-highest overall behind pitcher Ben McDonald (1989).

Previous season
In 2014, the Tigers finished the season 2nd in the SEC's Western Division with a record of 46–16–1, 17–11–1 in conference play. They qualified for the 2014 Southeastern Conference baseball tournament and defeated Florida in the final, 2–0, to win their 11th SEC Tournament title. They qualified for the 2014 NCAA Division I baseball tournament as the SEC's automatic bid, and were selected as the #8 overall national seed. The Tigers were selected as hosts of the Baton Rouge regional, which included Houston, Bryant, and Southeastern Louisiana. The Tigers won their first two games of the regional, defeating Southeastern Louisiana, 8–4, and Houston, 5–1. In the regional final, LSU was again matched up with Houston. In the first game of the regional final, the Cougars defeated the Tigers, 5–4, in 11 innings. The Cougars went on to win game two, 12–2, eliminating LSU and advancing to the Austin Super Regional, where they lost in two games to Texas.

Personnel

Roster

Coaching staff

Schedule

! style="" | Regular Season
|- valign="top" 

|- bgcolor="#bbffbb"
| February 13 || Kansas || #4 || Alex Box Stadium • Baton Rouge, LA || 4–1 || Poche' (1–0) || Morovick (0–1) || Stallings (1) || 11,122 || 1–0 ||
|- bgcolor="#bbffbb"
| February 14 || Kansas || #4 || Alex Box Stadium • Baton Rouge, LA || 8–5 || Lange (1–0) || Krauth (0–1) || || 10,903 || 2–0 ||
|- bgcolor="#bbffbb"
| February 15 || Kansas || #4 || Alex Box Stadium • Baton Rouge, LA || 7–4 || Devall (1–0) || Gilbert (0–1) || Stallings (2) || 10,703 || 3–0 ||
|- bgcolor="#ffbbbb"
| February 18 ||  || #4 || Alex Box Stadium • Baton Rouge, LA || 3–6 || Ernestine (1–0) || Norman (0–1) || Holmes (2) || 10,271 || 3–1 ||
|- bgcolor="#bbffbb"
| February 20 || Boston College || #4 || Alex Box Stadium • Baton Rouge, LA || 8–3 || Poche' (2–0) || Gorman (0–1) || || 10,389 || 4–1 ||
|- bgcolor="#bbffbb"
| February 20 || Boston College || #4 || Alex Box Stadium • Baton Rouge, LA || 7–4 || Lange (2–0) || Burke (0–1) || Stallings (3) || 10,582 || 5–1 ||
|- bgcolor="#bbffbb"
| February 21 || Boston College || #4 || Alex Box Stadium • Baton Rouge, LA || 16–2 || Godfrey (1–0) || Poore (0–1) || || 11,118 || 6–1 ||
|- bgcolor="#bbffbb"
| February 26 ||  || #3 || Alex Box Stadium • Baton Rouge, LA || 9–8 || Strall (1–0) || Cashman (0–2) || Stallings (4) || 10,069 || 7–1 ||
|- bgcolor="#bbffbb"
| February 27 ||  || #3 || Alex Box Stadium • Baton Rouge, LA || 3–2 ||  Poche' (3–0) || Powers (0–1) || Stallings (5) || 10,006 || 8–1 ||
|- bgcolor="#bbffbb"
| February 28 || Princeton || #3 || Alex Box Stadium • Baton Rouge, LA || 7–2 || Godfrey (2–0) || Strieber (0–1) || || 11,151 || 9–1 ||
|- bgcolor="#bbffbb"
| February 28 || Princeton || #3 || Alex Box Stadium • Baton Rouge, LA || 15–4 || Lange (3–0) || Smithers (0–1) || || 10,214 || 10–1 ||
|-

|- bgcolor="#bbffbb"
| March 3 ||  || #3 || Alex Box Stadium • Baton Rouge, LA || 8–1 || Newman (1–0) || Polivka (0–1) || || 9,581 || 11–1 ||
|- bgcolor="#bbffbb"
| March 4 ||  || #3 || Alex Box Stadium • Baton Rouge, LA || 7–1 || Norman (1–1) || Mckinney (1–1) || || 9,502 || 12–1 ||
|- bgcolor="#bbffbb"
| March 6 || vs. #12 Houston || #3 || Minute Maid Park • Houston, TX || 4–2 || Poche' (4–0) || Lantrip (3–1) || Stallings (6) || 10,651 || 13–1 ||
|- bgcolor="#bbffbb"
| March 7 || vs. Baylor || #3 || Minute Maid Park • Houston, TX || 2–0 || Lange (4–0) || Castano (0–2) || Stallings (7) || 16,276 || 14–1 ||
|- bgcolor="#bbffbb"
| March 8 || vs.  || #3 || Minute Maid Park • Houston, TX || 4–2 || Godfrey (3–0) || Burkamper (1–1) || Bugg (1) || 10,866 || 15–1 || –
|- bgcolor="#bbffbb"
| March 11 ||  || #2 || Alex Box Stadium • Baton Rouge, LA || 7–0 || Reynolds (1–0) || Stremmel (2–1) || || 9,684 || 16–1 || 
|- bgcolor="#bbffbb"
| March 13 ||  || #2 || Alex Box Stadium • Baton Rouge, LA || 6–4 || Poche' (5–0) || Trent (3–1) || Stallings (8) || 11,668 || 17–1 || 1–0
|- bgcolor="#ffbbbb"
| March 14 || Ole Miss || #2 || Alex Box Stadium • Baton Rouge, LA || 3–5 (14) || Short (3–1) || Bouman (0–1) || Stokes (3) || 12,164 || 17–2 || 1–1
|- bgcolor="#bbffbb"
| March 15 || Ole Miss || #2 || Alex Box Stadium • Baton Rouge, LA || 18–6 || Godfrey (4–0) || Smith (1–3) || || 11,148 || 18–2 || 2–1
|- bgcolor="#bbffbb"
| March 17 || at  || #3 || Lee–Hines Field • Baton Rouge, LA || 4–2 (10) || Strall (2–0) || Diaz (1–1) || Stallings (9) || 1,180 || 19–2 ||
|- bgcolor="#ffbbbb"
| March 19 || at Arkansas || #3 || Baum Stadium • Fayetteville, AR || 1–5 || Taccolini (4–2) || Poche' (5–1) || Jackson (1) || 7,304 || 19–3 || 2–2
|- bgcolor="#bbffbb"
| March 20 || at Arkansas || #3 || Baum Stadium • Fayetteville, AR || 16–3 || Lange (5–0) || Teague (0–1) || || 8,178 || 20–3 || 3–2
|- bgcolor="#bbffbb"
| March 21 || at Arkansas || #3 || Baum Stadium • Fayetteville, AR || 7–4 || Godfrey (5–0) || Killian (0–1) || Stallings (10) || 9,734 || 21–3 || 4–2
|- bgcolor="#bbffbb"
| March 24 || at Tulane || #2 || Greer Field • New Orleans, LA || 13–7 || Newman (2–0) || Duester (3–2) || || 4,994 || 22–3 ||
|- bgcolor="#ffbbbb"
| March 27 ||  || #2 || Alex Box Stadium • Baton Rouge, LA || 4–5 (12) || Strecker (2–0) || Stallings (0–1) || Jack (4) || 11,118 || 22–4 || 4–3
|- bgcolor="#bbffbb"
| March 28 || Kentucky || #2 || Alex Box Stadium • Baton Rouge, LA || 7–3 || Person (1–0) || Nelson (2–1) || || 11,516 || 23–4 || 5–3
|- bgcolor="#ffbbbb"
| March 29 || Kentucky || #2 || Alex Box Stadium • Baton Rouge, LA || 10–12 (11) || Jack (1–0) || Bugg (0–1) || || 10,732 || 23–5 || 5–4
|- bgcolor="#bbffbb"
| March 31 || vs. Louisiana–Lafayette || #5 || Zephyr Field • Metairie, LA || 8–6 || Reynolds (2–0) || Toups (1–2) || Stallings (11) || 10,853 || 24–5 ||
|-

|- bgcolor="#bbffbb"
| April 2 || at Alabama || #5 || Hoover Metropolitan Stadium • Hoover, AL || 8–5 (16) || Norman (2–1) || Wilhite (0–1) || || 4,117 || 25–5 || 6–4
|- bgcolor="#bbffbb"
| April 3 || at Alabama || #5 || Hoover Metropolitan Stadium • Hoover, AL || 6–2 || Lange (6–0) || Carter (1–4) || || 3,963 || 26–5 || 7–4
|- bgcolor="#bbffbb"
| April 4 || at Alabama || #5 || Hoover Metropolitan Stadium • Hoover, AL || 6–4 (13) || Stallings (1–1) || Burrows (0–3) || || 5,381 || 27–5 || 8–4
|- bgcolor="#bbffbb"
| April 7 ||  || #4 || Alex Box Stadium • Baton Rouge, LA || 11–2 || Reynolds (3–0) || Kelleher (1–4) || || 10,837 || 28–5 ||
|- bgcolor="#bbffbb"
| April 8 ||  || #4 || Alex Box Stadium • Baton Rouge, LA || 9–6 || Godfrey (6–0) || Tidwell (2–3) || || 10,676 || 29–5 ||
|- bgcolor="#bbffbb"
| April 10 ||  || #4 || Alex Box Stadium • Baton Rouge, LA || 3–2 || Poche' (6–1) || Lipscomb (4–1) || Newman (1) || 10,064 || 30–5 || 9–4
|- bgcolor="#ffbbbb"
| April 11 || Auburn || #4 || Alex Box Stadium • Baton Rouge, LA || 1–6 || Thompson (7–2) || Bain (0–1) || || 10,743 || 30–6 || 9–5
|- bgcolor="#bbffbb"
| April 12 || Auburn || #4 || Alex Box Stadium • Baton Rouge, LA || 6–2 || Person (2–0) || McCord (2–3) ||  || 10,037 || 31–6 || 10–5
|- bgcolor="#bbffbb"
| April 15 || Lamar || #3 || Alex Box Stadium • Baton Rouge, LA || 11–2 || Bouman (1–1) || Love (0–1) || || 9,947 || 32–6 ||
|- bgcolor="#bbffbb"
| April 18 || at  || #3 || Foley Field • Athens, GA || 4–1 || Lange (7–0) || Lawlor (4–5) || Newman (2) ||  || 33–6 || 11–5
|- bgcolor="#bbffbb"
| April 18 || at Georgia || #3 || Foley Field • Athens, GA || 9–1 || Poche' (7–1) || McLaughlin (3–3) || || 3,138 || 34–6 || 12–5
|- bgcolor="#bbbbbb"
| April 19 || at Georgia || #3 || Foley Field • Athens, GA || colspan=7| Cancelled
|- bgcolor="#bbffbb"
| April 21 || Tulane || #1 || Alex Box Stadium • Baton Rouge, LA || 6–0 || Bain (1–1) || Duester (4–4) || || 10,614 || 35–6 ||
|- bgcolor="#bbffbb"
| April 23 || #4  || #1 || Alex Box Stadium • Baton Rouge, LA || 4–3 || Strall (3–0) || Vinson (3–1) || || 10,822 || 36–6 || 13–5
|- bgcolor="#bbffbb"
| April 24 || #4 Texas A&M || #1 || Alex Box Stadium • Baton Rouge, LA || 9–6 || Reynolds (4–0) || Hendrix (3–1) || Newman (3) || 12,042 || 37–6 || 14–5
|- bgcolor="#ffbbbb"
| April 25 || #4 Texas A&M || #1 || Alex Box Stadium • Baton Rouge, LA || 2–6 || Simonds (3–1) || Bain (1–2) || Vinson (3) || 11,489 || 37–7 || 14–6
|- bgcolor="#bbffbb"
| April 28 ||  || #1 || Alex Box Stadium • Baton Rouge, LA || 6–1 || Norman (3–1) || Morales (0–5) || || 10,185 || 38–7 ||
|- bgcolor="#bbffbb"
| April 30 || at Mississippi State || #1 || Dudy Noble Field • Starkville, MS || 5–3 (14) || Godfrey (7–0) || Fitts (2–4) || Stallings (12) || 7,251 || 39–7 || 15–6
|-

|- bgcolor="#bbffbb"
| May 1 || at Mississippi State || #1 || Dudy Noble Field • Starkville, MS || 11–4 || Lange (8–0) || Brown (5–6) || Newman (4) || 8,293 || 40–7 || 16–6
|- bgcolor="#ffbbbb"
| May 2 || at Mississippi State || #1 || Dudy Noble Field • Starkville, MS || 7–8 (12) || Hudson (1–0) || Bugg (0–2) || || 8,480 || 40–8 || 16–7
|- bgcolor="#bbffbb"
| May 8 || Missouri || #1 || Alex Box Stadium • Baton Rouge, LA || 8–3 || Norman (4–1) || McClain (6–6) || – || 11,009 || 41–8 || 17–7
|- bgcolor="#bbffbb"
| May 9 || Missouri || #1 || Alex Box Stadium • Baton Rouge, LA || 8–2 || Lange (9–0) || Houck (7–4) || || 11,386 || 42–8 || 18–7
|- bgcolor="#bbffbb"
| May 10 || Missouri || #1 || Alex Box Stadium • Baton Rouge, LA || 6–5 (10) || Reynolds (5–0) || Williams (4–3) || || 11,208 || 43–8 || 19–7
|- bgcolor="#bbffbb"
| May 12 || at New Orleans || #1 || Maestri Field • New Orleans, LA || 9–1 || Devall (2–0) || Kelleher (2–9) || || 2,380 || 44–8 ||
|- bgcolor="#ffbbbb"
| May 14 || at South Carolina || #1 || Carolina Stadium • Columbia, SC || 7–10 || Scott (2–3) || Godfrey (7–1) || || 7,507 || 44–9 || 19–8
|- bgcolor="#bbffbb"
| May 15 || at South Carolina || #1 || Carolina Stadium • Columbia, SC || 9–2 || Bain (2–2) || Schmidt (2–2) || || 8,242 || 45–9 || 20–8
|- bgcolor="#bbffbb"
| May 16 || at South Carolina || #1 || Carolina Stadium • Columbia, SC || 8–1 || Lange (10–0) || Widener (1–5) || || 8.242 || 46–9 || 21–8
|-

|- 
! style="" | Post-Season
|-

|- bgcolor="#bbffbb"
| May 20 || vs. Auburn || #1 || Hoover Metropolitan Stadium • Hoover, AL || 9–8 || Norman (5–1) || Wingenter (1–6) || Bugg (2) ||  || 47–9 || 1–0
|- bgcolor="#bbffbb"
| May 21 || vs. #30 Arkansas || #1 || Hoover Metropolitan Stadium • Hoover, AL || 10–5 || Reynolds (6–0) || Teague (4–4) || || 8,361 || 48–9 || 2–0
|- bgcolor="#ffbbbb"
| May 23 || vs. #9 Florida || #1 || Hoover Metropolitan Stadium • Hoover, AL || 1–2 || Lewis (6–1) || Stallings (1–2) || || 10,949 || 48–10 || 2–1
|-

|- bgcolor="#bbffbb"
| May 29 || Lehigh || (2) || Alex Box Stadium • Baton Rouge, LA || 10–3 || Newman (3–0) || Boswick (3–4) || || 10,945 || 49–10 || 1–0
|- bgcolor="#bbffbb"
| May 30 || UNC Wilmington || (2) || Alex Box Stadium • Baton Rouge, LA || 2–0 || Lange (11–0) || Phillips (2–2) || || 11,251 || 50–10 || 2–0
|- bgcolor="#bbffbb"
| June 1 || UNC Wilmington || (2) || Alex Box Stadium • Baton Rouge, LA || 2–0 || Poche' (8–1) || Crump (1–2) || Bugg (3) || 11,301 || 51–10 || 3–0
|-

|- bgcolor="#bbffbb"
| June 6 || Louisiana–Lafayette || (2) || Alex Box Stadium • Baton Rouge, LA || 4–3 || Bugg (1–2) || Bacon (6–3) ||  || 11,179 || 52–10 || 4–0
|- bgcolor="#bbffbb"
| June 7 || Louisiana–Lafayette || (2) || Alex Box Stadium • Baton Rouge, LA || 6–3 || Poche' (9–1) || Leger (6–5) ||  || 11,795 || 53–10 || 5–0
|-

|- bgcolor="#ffbbbb"
| June 14 ||(7) TCU || (2) || TD Ameritrade Park Omaha • Omaha, NE || 3–10 || Morrison (12–3) || Poche' (9–2) ||  || 24,506 || 53–11 || 5-1
|- bgcolor="#bbffbb"
| June 16 || Cal State Fullerton || (2) || TD Ameritrade Park Omaha • Omaha, NE || 5–3 || Lange (12–0) || Seabold (5–4) ||  || 18,751 || 54–11 || 6-1
|- bgcolor="#ffbbbb"
| June 18 || (7) TCU || (2) || TD Ameritrade Park Omaha • Omaha, NE || 4–8 || Teakell (3–1) || Bain (2–3) ||  || 26,803 || 54–12 || 6-2
|-

|-
| style="font-size:88%" | All rankings from Collegiate Baseball.

Rankings

Awards and honors
Paul Mainieri
 SEC Coach of the Year
 NCBWA Coach of the Year

Alex Bregman
 Louisville Slugger Pre-season Second team All-American
 Perfect Game USA Pre-season First team All-American
 Baseball America Pre-season First team All-American
 First team All-SEC
 SEC All-Defensive Team
 Louisville Slugger First team All-American
 Baseball America First team All-American

Chris Chinea
 Second team All-SEC
 Louisville Slugger Third team All-American
 NCAA Baton Rouge Regional All-Tournament Team

Jared Foster
 SEC All-Tournament Team

Conner Hale
 First team All-SEC
 NCAA Baton Rouge Regional All-Tournament Team

Mark Laird
 SEC All-Defensive Team

Alex Lange
 SEC Freshman of the Year
 First team All-SEC
 Louisville Slugger First team All-American
 NCAA Baton Rouge Regional All-Tournament Team
 Most Outstanding Player, NCAA Baton Rouge Regional
 NCBWA Freshman All-American
 NCBWA Freshman Pitcher of the Year
 Baseball America First team All-American

Jared Poche'
 Louisville Slugger Pre-season Second team All-American

Kade Scivicque
 First team All-SEC
 SEC All-Defensive Team
 Louisville Slugger Second team All-American
 Baseball America Second team All-American

Jesse Stallings
 NCBWA Freshman All-American

Andrew Stevenson
 First team All-SEC
 SEC All-Defensive Team
 NCAA Baton Rouge Regional All-Tournament Team
 Baseball America Third team All-American

References

LSU Tigers
LSU Tigers baseball seasons
LSU Tigers base
LSU
Southeastern Conference baseball champion seasons
College World Series seasons